Dave Gelly MBE (born 28 January 1938) is a British jazz critic. A long-standing contributor to The Observer, he was named Jazz Writer of the Year in the 1999 British Jazz Awards. Gelly is also a jazz saxophonist and broadcaster, presenting a number of shows for BBC Radio 2 including Night Owls for much of the 1980s.

Biography 
Gelly was born in Bexleyheath, Kent, on 28 January 1938, and grew up in south London. He attended St Dunstan's College, Catford, and won a scholarship to read English under F. R. Leavis at Downing College, Cambridge. Gelly played with Art Themen and Lionel Grigson in the Cambridge University band, and from the mid-1960s co-led his own quartets and quintets with Frank Ricotti, with Jeff Scott, and with Barbara Thompson. Gelly was a member of the New Jazz Orchestra, directed by Neil Ardley, which also featured Ian Carr, Jon Hiseman, Barbara Thompson, Mike Gibbs, Don Rendell, and Trevor Tomkins.
Gelly was a teacher during the 1960s and 1970s at William Penn School, Dulwich.

Discography
As leader/co-leader
2001: Strike A Light (Mainstem Records)
As sideman
1968: Le Dejeuner sur L'Herbe – The New Jazz Orchestra
1971: A Symphony of Amaranths – Neil Ardley
1973: Mike Taylor Remembered (with Jon Hiseman, Barbara Thompson, Ian Carr, Henry Lowther, Norma Winstone, Ron Mathewson, Stan Sulzmann, Alan Branscombe and Chris Pyne, among others)
2003: John Williams's Tenorama (Spotlite Records)

Publications
The Giants of Jazz (Schirmer Books, 1986) with Miles Kington 
Masters of Jazz Saxophone: The Story of the Players and Their Music (2000)
Stan Getz: Nobody Else But Me (2002) 
Being Prez: The Life and Music of Lester Young (Equinox, 2007)
An Unholy Row (Equinox, 2014)

References

External links
Official website

1938 births
Alumni of Downing College, Cambridge
BBC Radio 2 presenters
British music critics
Jazz writers
Living people
New Jazz Orchestra members